Imaani Saleem (born Melonie Crosdale on 1 January 1972) is an English singer, best known for representing the United Kingdom at the Eurovision Song Contest 1998 in Birmingham with the song "Where Are You". The song placed second in the contest, and became a top 20 hit in the United Kingdom, the Netherlands, and Belgium.

Although "Where Are You?" remains her sole solo chart entry, in 2000 she re-entered the top 20 of the UK Singles Chart alongside Tru Faith & Dub Conspiracy with their version of "Freak Like Me". Later, she recorded many songs with jazz-dance group Incognito, and in 2014 released her debut studio album, Standing Tall.

Career
After leaving college and moving to London, a chance train encounter with a music producer led to Imaani entering the music business. In 1995, she provided vocals on the song "Easin' My Mind" by FM Inc., and in 1996, on Incognito's album Beneath the Surface.

Eurovision 1998
In 1998, Saleem entered The Great British Song Contest competition to find the UK's song for the Eurovision Song Contest that year. Her track "Where Are You" was a runaway winner with the British public and was selected to represent the UK. Saleem finished a mere seven points behind the winner Dana International, in second place in the Eurovision Song Contest 1998.

After its success in the contest, "Where Are You" entered the UK Singles Chart in May 1998, peaking at number 15 and spending 15 non-consecutive weeks in the top 100. The track sold over 250,000 copies. Despite this success, her record label EMI decided to cancel the release of her follow-up single "You Got a Way" in 1999 and parted company with Saleem.

After Eurovision
In 2000, she supplied the lead vocals on Tru Faith & Dub Conspiracy's UK garage cover of Adina Howard's "Freak Like Me". The song reached No. 12 on the UK Singles Chart. Saleem went on to record with the jazz-funk band Incognito, providing vocals for more than 10 of their records.

Since 2005, Saleem has performed as part of UK session organisation The AllStars Collective. The following year, in 2006, she sang on the house track "Bring Me Love" by the Copyright Project on Defected Records. The track received a limited release in the UK, but reached the top 5 on the UK Dance Chart.

In 2014, Saleem released her debut album, Standing Tall. One of its songs, "Struggling" featured on the 2015 soul compilation album Luxury Soul 2015.

Discography

Albums
Standing Tall (2014)

Charted singles

References

External links
 

1972 births
Living people
Eurovision Song Contest entrants for the United Kingdom
Eurovision Song Contest entrants of 1998
People from Nottingham
21st-century Black British women singers
UK garage singers
20th-century Black British women singers
Incognito (band) members